McBay is a surname. Notable people with the surname include:

Henry Cecil McBay (1914–1995), American chemist and educator
Shirley McBay (1935–2021), American mathematician and non-profit chief executive

See also
McBey